Abílio Vieira is a football player who currently plays for Timor-Leste national football team.

International career
Abílio made his senior international debut in an 8–0 loss against United Arab Emirates national football team in the 2018 FIFA World Cup qualification on 12 November 2015.

References

Living people
East Timorese footballers
Timor-Leste international footballers
Association football forwards
Year of birth missing (living people)